Alice Nesti (born 18 July 1989, in Pistoia) is an Italian swimmer. He competed in the 4 × 200 metre freestyle relay event at the 2012 Summer Olympics. At the 2012 European Aquatics Championships Nesti and her teammates won the gold in the 4 x 200 metre freestyle relay.

References

1989 births
Living people
Olympic swimmers of Italy
Swimmers at the 2012 Summer Olympics
Italian female freestyle swimmers
European Aquatics Championships medalists in swimming
People from Pistoia
Sportspeople from the Province of Pistoia